The FH Westküste University of Applied Sciences (German Fachhochschule Westküste) is a vocational university of higher education and applied research located in the city of Heide in the Federal State of Schleswig-Holstein.

References

Universities of Applied Sciences in Germany
1993 establishments in Germany
Universities and colleges in Schleswig-Holstein
Educational institutions established in 1993